The Sony Xperia Z5 is an Android smartphone produced by Sony. Part of the Sony Xperia Z series, the device, at that point known by the project code name "Sumire",  was unveiled along with the Xperia Z5 Compact and Xperia Z5 Premium during a press conference at IFA 2015 on September 2, 2015. The device was launched globally in October and was launched in the United States as an unlocked device in February 2016. It is the successor to the Sony Xperia Z3+.

Similar to its predecessor, the device is water and dust proof with an IP rating of 65 and 68. It is Sony's first device to feature a fingerprint sensor. The device comes with 23 Megapixel camera with 0.03 seconds Hybrid Autofocus that utilizes phase detection autofocus, similarly found in the Xperia M5.

In February 2016, it was confirmed by Sony Mobile's senior product marketing manager Jun Makino that the Sony Xperia Z5 will be the final smartphone in the Sony Xperia Z series, with all future releases being released as part of the Sony Xperia X series. However this rumor was dismissed as Sony's Head of Marketing, Don Mesa has clarified that the X Series will not replace the Z Series.

Specifications

Hardware

Unlike its predecessors, the Xperia Z5's body design consists of an aluminium frame with a frosted glass backing to reduce fingerprints appearing on the back of the phone. The device carries an IP rating of IP65 and IP68, making it dust and water resistant. The device also features a 64-bit 2.0 GHz octa-core Qualcomm Snapdragon 810 system-on-chip with 3 GB of RAM. The device also has 32 GB internal storage with microSD card expansion up to 200 GB. The device also includes a non-removable 2900 mAh battery.

The rear-facing camera of the Xperia Z5 is 23 megapixels with sensor size of 1/2.3 inch and an aperture of f/2.0, featuring a newer Sony Exmor RS image sensor, instead of the 20.7 megapixels image sensor which was used in all of its predecessors, starting from the Xperia Z1. Similarly found in the Xperia M5, the devices also features hybrid autofocus that utilizes phase detection autofocus that can focus the object within 0.03 seconds.

Xperia Z5 also features a redesigned power button located on the right side of the device with a fingerprint recognition system which can be used to unlock the phone. However, the fingerprint sensor is disabled in the US version of the phone due to a "business decision", although it can be reenabled by modifying the firmware.

Software
The Xperia Z5 is preinstalled with Android 5.1 Lollipop with Sony's custom interface and software. Pre-loaded applications on the Z5 provide access to Google's various services, including Google Play, which can be used to download and purchase apps, music, movies, and e-books.

On first week of March 2016, Sony released the Android 6.0 Marshmallow software update for the Xperia Z5.

On August 23, 2016, Sony announced that the Xperia Z5 would receive an upgrade to Android 7.0 Nougat. The update started rolling out in January 2017, but was put on hold shortly thereafter upon "reports from some users experiencing inconsistencies related to audio playback via third-party apps and SD card encrypted data read performance." The update re-commenced in February 2017.

See also
Sony Xperia Z5 Compact
Sony Xperia Z5 Premium

References

External links

Official Press Release
Official Whitepaper
Official Whitepaper (Dual SIM version)
For Full Information About This Mobile

Android (operating system) devices
Discontinued flagship smartphones
Sony smartphones
Mobile phones introduced in 2015
Digital audio players
Mobile phones with 4K video recording